George Clinton and His Gangsters of Love is a cover album by funk music pioneer George Clinton. The album includes guest appearances from the Red Hot Chili Peppers, Sly Stone, El DeBarge, System of a Down bassist Shavo Odadjian, Carlos Santana, RZA, Kim Manning and gospel singer Kim Burrell. The disc was released on September 16, 2008.

Some suggest the title of the album may actually be Radio Friendly, and that "George Clinton and Some Gangsters of Love" may be credited as the artist for the album. The album has also been referred to as Any Percentage of You Is As Good as the Whole Pie, although that may refer to another P-Funk album to be released later.

It features the last song recorded by the Red Hot Chili Peppers with guitarist John Frusciante prior to his second departure of the band in 2009.

Track listing 
 "Ain't That Peculiar" (feat. Sly Stone & El DeBarge)
 "Never Gonna Give You Up" (feat. El DeBarge)
 "Mathematics of Love" (feat. Kim Burrell)
 "Let the Good Times Roll" (feat. Red Hot Chili Peppers & Kim Manning)
 "Pledging My Love"
 "Gypsy Woman" (feat. Carlos Santana & El DeBarge)
 "It's All in the Game" (feat. El DeBarge)
 "Heart Trouble" (feat. Paul Hill)
 "Our Day Will Come" (feat. Kendra Foster)
 "Sway" (feat. Belita Woods)
 "A Thousand Miles Away"
 "Heaven" (feat. RZA) (Hidden)
 "As In" (Hidden)
 "Stillness in Motion" (Hidden)
 "Fever" (Hidden)

References

External links 
 George Clinton and His Gangsters of Love at Discogs

2008 albums
George Clinton (funk musician) albums
Covers albums